Randy Jordan (born June 6, 1970) is an American football coach and former player who is the running backs coach for the Washington Commanders of the National Football League (NFL). He played college football for the University of North Carolina. He was not selected in the 1993 NFL Draft, and subsequently played nine seasons for the Los Angeles Raiders, Jacksonville Jaguars, and Oakland Raiders.

Jordan attended the University of North Carolina, where he was a running back for Mack Brown's North Carolina Tarheels football team, playing alongside fellow running back and future Jacksonville teammate Natrone Means. As a junior in 1991, he had 124 carries for 618 yards with seven rushing touchdowns, and 11 catches for 160 yards with two touchdown receptions. During his 1992 senior season, Jordan had 59 carries for 225 yards with one touchdown, and seven receptions for 101 yards and a touchdown. He scored the first touchdown of the expansion Jacksonville Jaguars in 1995.

References

External links
Washington Commanders bio

1970 births
Living people
American football running backs
North Carolina Tar Heels football players
Los Angeles Raiders players
Jacksonville Jaguars players
Oakland Raiders players
Washington Commanders coaches
Washington Football Team coaches
Washington Redskins coaches
Nebraska Cornhuskers football coaches
People from Warren County, North Carolina
Oakland Raiders coaches
Texas A&M Aggies football coaches
North Carolina Tar Heels football coaches
Coaches of American football from North Carolina
Players of American football from North Carolina
Ed Block Courage Award recipients